Nicholas "Nicky" S. Kiss is a former professional rugby league footballer who played in the 1970s and 1980s.

Playing career

Kiss was a colourful character in Rugby League, and was popular with fans and players alike.

International honours
Kiss won a cap for Great Britain while at Wigan in 1985 against France.

Championship appearances
Kiss played in Wigan's victories in the Championship during the 1986–87 season and 1989–90 season.

Premiership Final appearances
Kiss played  in Wigan's 8-0 victory over Warrington in the Premiership Final during the 1986–87 season at Old Trafford, Manchester on Sunday 17 May 1987.

World Club Challenge
Kiss played  in Wigan's 8-2 victory over Manly-Warringah Sea Eagles in the 1987 World Club Challenge at Central Park, Wigan on Wednesday 7 October 1987.

Challenge Cup Final appearances
Kiss played  in three Challenge Cup Finals for Wigan; the 28-24 victory over Hull F.C. in the 1985 Challenge Cup Final during the 1984–85 season at Wembley Stadium, London on Saturday 4 May 1985, the 32-12 victory over Halifax in the 1988 Challenge Cup Final during the 1987–88 season at Wembley Stadium, London on Saturday 30 April 1988, and in the 27-0 victory over St. Helens, and in the 1989 Challenge Cup Final during the 1988–89 season at Wembley Stadium, London on Saturday 29 April 1989.

County Cup Final appearances
Kiss played , and scored a try in Wigan's 18-26 defeat by St. Helens in the 1984 Lancashire County Cup Final during the 1984–85 season at Central Park, Wigan, on Sunday 28 October 1984, played , and scored a try in the 34-8 victory over Warrington in the 1985 Lancashire County Cup Final during the 1985–86 season at Knowsley Road, St. Helens, on Sunday 13 October 1985, and played  in the 28-16 victory over Warrington in the 1987 Lancashire County Cup Final during the 1987–88 season at Knowsley Road, St. Helens, on Sunday 11 October 1987.

John Player Trophy Final appearances
Kiss played  in Wigan's 15-4 victory over Leeds in the 1982–83 John Player Special Trophy Final during the 1982–83 season at Elland Road, Leeds on Saturday 22 January 1983, and in the 18-4 victory over Hull Kingston Rovers in the 1985–86 John Player Special Trophy Final during the 1985–86 season at Elland Road, Leeds on Saturday 11 January 1986.

Notable tour matches
Kiss played  in Wigan's 14-8 victory over New Zealand in the 1985 New Zealand rugby league tour of Great Britain and France match at Central Park, Wigan on Sunday 6 October 1985.

Testimonial match
Kiss was rewarded for 10 years of service with a Testimonial match at Wigan that took place in 1988, kicking a late conversion - the only goal of his career.

Retirement
Kiss suffered a bad arm injury shortly after the start of the 1989-90 season, which coupled with a car accident, led him to miss the rest of the year. At the end of the season he announced his retirement on medical advice.

References

External links
!Great Britain Statistics at englandrl.co.uk (statistics currently missing due to not having appeared for both Great Britain, and England)

Living people
English rugby league players
Great Britain national rugby league team players
Place of birth missing (living people)
Rugby league hookers
Wigan Warriors players
Year of birth missing (living people)